Motherhood or The Grief and Joy of Motherhood (Swedish: Moderskapets kval och lycka) is a 1945 Swedish drama film directed by Ivar Johansson and starring Birgit Rosengren, Björn Berglund and Allan Bohlin. The film's sets were designed by the art director Bertil Duroj.

Synopsis
Eva-Maria Dahl lives a happy married life with husband Erik, but one day she faints and is taken to a doctor who informs her she is pregnant. This is concerning as a doctor has previously told her that with her health conditions it would be dangerous for her to have a child.

Cast
 Birgit Rosengren as Eva-Maria Dahl
 Björn Berglund as 	Erik Dahl
 Ruth Moberg as Kerstin Manell
 Allan Bohlin as Sture Manell
 Barbro Ribbing as Anna Skog
 Marianne Löfgren as 	Mrs. Clarin
 Nils Kihlberg as Mr. Clarin
 Anna-Lisa Baude as 	Mrs. Berg
 Anna Lindahl as 	Welfare Officer
 Millan Bolander as 	Nurse Märta
 Lisskulla Jobs as 	Ellen Karlsson
 Elof Ahrle as Svenne Karlsson
 Gösta Cederlund as 	Chief Physician
 Sten Lindgren as 	Doctor
 Börje Mellvig as 	Gynecologist
 Naemi Briese as Woman with Erik at the Inn 
 Gunnar Ekwall as 	Svensson 
 Eivor Engelbrektsson as 	Nurse 
 Lisbeth Hedendahl as Mrs. Holmgren 
 Agda Helin as Mrs. Björk 
 Margareta Högfors as 	Miss Klein 
 Greta Liming as Toy store assistant 
 Signe Lundberg-Settergren as 	Midwife 
 Millan Lyxell as Clerk at the maternity ward 
 Britta Nordin as 	Elsa Göransson 
 Hanny Schedin as 	Woman at the maternity ward 
 Georg Skarstedt as 	Father in taxi 
 Carin Swensson as Shop assistant in milk store 
 Greta Tegnér	as Internship Nurse 
 Ivar Wahlgren as 	Toy store customer

References

Bibliography 
 Qvist, Per Olov & von Bagh, Peter. Guide to the Cinema of Sweden and Finland. Greenwood Publishing Group, 2000.

External links 
 

1945 films
Swedish drama films
1945 drama films
1940s Swedish-language films
Films directed by Ivar Johansson
Swedish black-and-white films
1940s Swedish films